In Greek mythology, King Erichthonius was a legendary early ruler of ancient Athens. According to some myths, he was autochthonous (born of the soil, or Earth) and adopted or raised by the goddess Athena. Early Greek texts do not distinguish between him and Erechtheus, his grandson, but by the fourth century BC, during Classical times, they are distinct figures.

Etymology 
Erichthonius of uncertain etymology is possibly related to a pre-Greek form *Erekteu-.

Mythology

Birth

According to the Bibliotheca, Athena visited the smith-god Hephaestus to request some weapons, but Hephaestus was so overcome by desire that he tried to seduce her in his workshop. Determined to maintain her virginity, Athena fled, pursued by Hephaestus. He caught Athena and tried to rape her, but she fought him off. During the struggle, his semen fell on her thigh, and Athena, in disgust, wiped it away with a scrap of wool (erion) and flung it to the earth (chthôn). As she fled, Erichthonius was born from the semen that fell to the earth. Athena, wishing to raise the child in secret, placed him in a small box and then made sure no one would ever find out by giving him away.

Athena gave the box to the three daughters (Herse, Aglaurus and Pandrosus) of Cecrops, the king of Athens, and warned them never to look inside. Pandrosus obeyed, but Herse and Aglaurus were overcome with curiosity and opened the box, which contained the infant and future-king, Erichthonius ("troubles born from the earth," following another etymology). (Sources are unclear regarding how many sisters participated.) The sisters were terrified by what they saw in the box: Either a snake coiled around an infant, or an infant that was half-human and half-serpent. They went insane and threw themselves off the Acropolis. Other accounts state that they were killed by the snake.

An alternative version of the story is that Athena left the box with the daughters of Cecrops while she went to fetch a limestone mountain from the Pallene peninsula to use in the Acropolis. While she was away, Aglaurus and Herse opened the box. A crow saw them open the box, and flew away to tell Athena, who fell into a rage and dropped the mountain she was carrying (now Mt. Lykabettos). As in the first version, Herse and Aglaurus went insane and threw themselves to their deaths off a cliff.

Reign 
When he grew up, Erichthonius drove out Amphictyon, who had usurped the throne from Cranaus twelve years earlier, and  became king of Athens.  He married Praxithea, a naiad, with whom he had a son, . During this time, Athena frequently protected him.  He founded the Panathenaic Festival in the honor of Athena, and set up a wooden statue of her on the Acropolis.  According to the Parian Chronicle, he taught his people to yoke horses and use them to pull chariots, to smelt silver, and to till the earth with a plough.

It was said that Erichthonius was lame of his feet and that he consequently invented the quadriga, or four-horse chariot, to get around more easily. He is said to have competed often as a chariot driver in games. Zeus was said to have been so impressed with his skill that he raised him to the heavens to become the constellation of the Charioteer (Auriga) after his death.

The snake is his symbol, and he is represented in the statue of Athena in the Parthenon as the snake hidden behind her shield. The most sacred building on the Acropolis of Athens, the Erechtheum, is dedicated to Erichthonius.

Erichthonius was succeeded by his son Pandion I.

Gallery

Footnotes

References

Sources
 Apollodorus, Apollodorus, The Library, with an English Translation by Sir James George Frazer, F.B.A., F.R.S. in 2 Volumes. Cambridge, MA, Harvard University Press; London, William Heinemann Ltd. 1921.  Online version at the Perseus Digital Library.
 Beekes, S. P., Etymological Dictionary of Greek, 2 vols. Leiden: Brill, 2009.
 Graves, Robert; The Greek Myths, Moyer Bell Ltd; Unabridged edition (December 1988), .
 Homer, The Iliad with an English Translation by A.T. Murray, Ph.D. in two volumes. Cambridge, MA., Harvard University Press; London, William Heinemann, Ltd. 1924. Online version at the Perseus Digital Library.
 Smith, William; Dictionary of Greek and Roman Biography and Mythology, London (1873). Erichthonius

See also

External links 
 

Autochthons of classical mythology
Children of Gaia
Children of Hephaestus
Kings of Athens
Kings in Greek mythology
Attican characters in Greek mythology
Deeds of Athena